The penumbra is the part of a shadow where the light source is only partially blocked.

Penumbra may also refer to:

Entertainment
 Penumbra (band), a French gothic metal band
 Penumbra Diffuse, the second studio album by American progressive metal band Canvas Solaris
 "Penumbra", a song by John Ireland
 "Penumbra", a song by Tortoise
 "Penumbra" (Star Trek: Deep Space Nine), a 1999 episode of Star Trek: Deep Space Nine
 Penumbra (telenovela), Mexican telenovela
 Penumbra (World of Darkness), a region in the World of Darkness line of role-playing games
 Penumbra (video game series), a series of video games by Frictional Games consisting of:
 Penumbra: Overture
 Penumbra: Black Plague
 Penumbra: Requiem

Companies
 Penumbra Theatre Company, an African American theatre in Saint Paul, Minnesota
 Penumbra (medical company), in Alameda, California

Other uses
 Penumbra (law), a metaphor for rights implied in the United States Constitution
 Penumbra (medicine), surviving tissue at the margin of an ischemic event (such as a stroke) which is in danger of hypoxia and subsequent cell death
 Penumbra (Sun), the ring-shaped semi-bright region of a sunspot that surrounds the darker umbra
 Penumbral lunar eclipse, an eclipse that occurs when the Moon passes through the Earth's penumbra
 Billbergia 'Penumbra', a hybrid cultivar of the genus Billbergia in the Bromeliad family

See also
 Umbra (disambiguation)